Clark E. Bisbee is an American politician and businessman from Jackson, Michigan. He is the owner of  Bisbee Travel, a local travel agency.

He served as the Republican representative to Michigan's state house from Michigan's 64th district until 2004, until having served the maximum number of terms.
Republican Rick Baxter succeeded him for one term.

In 2004 Bisbee ran in the   Republican primary for the U.S. House of Representatives, Michigan's 7th congressional district, but received only 14% of the primary vote (fourth place in a six-way race).

Family
Bisbee is married to his wife Katie and together they have four children.

Education
Bisbee received his BA in Business from Albion College.

Professional experience
Bisbee is currently the owner of Bisbee Travel Inc.
From 1978-1989 he was the founder and operator of Infrared Services
From 1968-1978 he was a teller for Commercial Loan Officer

References

External links

1949 births
Living people
Politicians from Jackson, Michigan
Albion College alumni
American transportation businesspeople
Republican Party members of the Michigan House of Representatives
20th-century American politicians
21st-century American politicians